Chacao is a village located at southern shore of Chacao Channel that separates Chiloé Island from the mainland. Chacao was established as a Spanish outpost with the name of San Antonio de Chacao in 1567 during the conquest of Chiloé.

References

Ancud
Port settlements in Chile
Populated places established in 1567
Populated places in Chiloé Province